Le Plus Grand Français de tous les temps ("The Greatest Frenchman of all Time") was a France 2 show of early 2005, based on an original series of Great Britons on the BBC. The show asked the French viewers whom they thought was the Greatest Frenchman or Frenchwoman. It was presented by Michel Drucker and Thierry Ardisson, and the final episode was broadcast at the French Senate.

The winner was the former president and leader of the Free French movement, Charles de Gaulle.

The show was criticized by some historians in that it focused only on personalities of recent French history. Key figures of French history who contributed to the founding of the French nation, such as the national heroine Joan of Arc, the kings Philip Augustus, Saint Louis, and Louis XIV or French Emperor Napoleon Bonaparte were largely ignored.

From 11 to 102 
11. Marcel Pagnol (1895-1974) - Novelist, playwright and film director.

12. Georges Brassens (1921-1981) - Singer and songwriter .

13. Fernandel (1903-1971) - Singer, actor and comedian.

14. Jean De La Fontaine (1621-1695) - Poet and fabulist.

15. Jules Verne (1828-1905) – Science fiction author.

16. Napoleon Bonaparte (1769-1821) – Military leader and emperor.

17. Louis de Funès (1914-1983) - Actor and comedian.

18. Jean Gabin (1904-1976) - Actor.

19. Daniel Balavoine (1952-1986) - Singer, songwriter and musician.

20. Serge Gainsbourg (1928-1991) - Singer and songwriter.

21. Zinedine Zidane (1972) - Footballer.

22. Charlemagne (748-814) – Emperor.

23. Lino Ventura (1919-1987) - Actor.

24. François Mitterrand (1916-1996) – President.

25. Gustave Eiffel (1832-1923) – Architect.

26. Émile Zola (1840-1902) - Novelist.

27. Sœur Emmanuelle (1908-2008) - Nun and humanitarian.

28. Jean Moulin (1899-1943) - Leader of French resistance during World War II.

29. Charles Aznavour (1924-2018) - Singer, songwriter and actor.

30. Yves Montand (1921-1991) -  Actor and singer.

31. Jeanne d’Arc (1412-1431) – Military leader.

32. Général Leclerc (1902-1947) - Military leader.

33. Voltaire (1694-1778) – Philosopher and novelist.

34. Johnny Hallyday (1943-2017) - Singer.

35. Antoine de Saint Exupéry (1900-1944) - Aviator, novelist and poet .

36. Claude Francois (1939-1978) - Singer

37. Christian Cabrol - Cardiologist and surgeon

38. Jean-Paul Belmondo (1933-2021) - Actor

39. Jules Ferry (1832-1893) - Politician and Prime Minister

40. Louis Lumière - Inventor, film director

41. Michel Platini (1955-) - Footballer

42. Jacques Chirac (1932-2019) – President and Prime Minister

43. Charles Trenet (1913-2001) - Singer and songwriter

44. Georges Pompidou (1911-1974) – President and Prime Minister

45. Michel Sardou (1947-) - Singer

46. Simone Signoret (1921-1985) - Actress

47. Haroun Tazieff (1914-1998) - Vulcanologist

48. Jacques Prévert (1900-1977) - Poet

49. Éric Tabarly (1931-1998) - Sailor

50. Louis XIV (1638-1715) – King

51. David Douillet (1969-) - Judoka

52. Henri Salvador (1917-2008) - Singer and comedian

53. Jean-Jacques Goldman (1951-) - Singer, songwriter and musician

54. Jean Jaurès (1859-1914) - Politician

55. Jean Marais (1913-1998) - Actor and comedian

56. Yannick Noah (1960-) - Tennis player

57. Albert Camus (1913-1960) – Author and philosopher

58. Dalida (1933-1987) - Singer

59. Léon Zitrone (1914-1995) - Journalist

60. Nicolas Hulot (1955-) - Journalist

61. Simone Veil (1927-2017) - Politician

62. Alain Delon (1935-) - Actor

63. Patrick Poivre d'Arvor (1947-) - Journalist

64. Aimé Jacquet (1941-) - Footballer

65. Francis Cabrel (1953-) - Singer and songwriter

66. Brigitte Bardot (1934-) - Actress

67. Guy de Maupassant (1850-1893) - Author

68. Alexandre Dumas, père (1802-1870) – Author and playwright

69. Honoré de Balzac (1799-1850) – Novelist

70. Paul Verlaine (1844-1896) - Poet

71. Jean-Jacques Rousseau (1712-1778) – Author and philosopher

72. Maximilien de Robespierre (1758-1794) – Political leader

73. Renaud (1952-) - Singer and Songwriter

74. Bernard Kouchner (1938-) - Politician and humanitarian

75. Claude Monet (1840-1926) – Painter

76. Michel Serrault (1928-2007) - Actor

77. Pierre-Auguste Renoir (1841-1919) – Painter

78. Michel Drucker (1942) - Journalist

79. Raimu (1883-1946) - Actor and Comedian

80. Vercingetorix (c.82BC-46BC) - Chieftain who led resistance against the Roman army.

81. Raymond Poulidor (1936-2019) - Cyclist

82. Charles Baudelaire (1821-1867) – Poet

83. Pierre Corneille (1606-1684) - Playwright

84. Arthur Rimbaud (1854-1891) - Poet

85. Georges Clemenceau (1841-1929) – Prime Minister, and journalist

86. Gilbert Bécaud (1927-2001) - Singer, songwriter and musician

87. José Bové (1953-) - Syndicalist

88. Jean Ferrat (1930-2010) - Singer and songwriter

89. Lionel Jospin (1937-) - Prime Minister

90. Jean Cocteau (1889-1963) - Dramatist, poet, playwright and filmmaker

91. Luc Besson (1959-) - Film director

92. Tino Rossi (1907-1983) - Singer

93. Pierre de Coubertin (1863-1937) - Pedagogue and founder of the modern Olympic Games.

94. Jean Renoir (1894-1979) – Film director

95. Gérard Philipe (1922-1959) - Actor and comedian

96. Jean-Paul Sartre (1905-1980) – Philosopher, novelist and playwright

97. Catherine Deneuve (1943-) - Actress

98. Serge Reggiani (1922-2004) - Actor, singer and comedian

99. Gérard Depardieu (1948-) - Actor

100. Françoise Dolto (1908-1988) - Psychoanalyst

101. Rene Descartes (1596-1650) - Philosopher, mathematician, and scientist.

102. Blaise Pascal (1623-1662) - Mathematician, physicist, inventor, writer and Catholic theologian

See also

 Greatest Britons spin-offs

References

External links

2005 French television series debuts
2005 French television series endings
Greatest Nationals
French culture
Lists of French people
French television series based on British television series